Raoul Biltgen (born 1 July 1974, Esch-sur-Alzette) is a Luxembourgish actor and writer.

He has written several theatrical plays and lives currently in  Vienna.

Works 
 Einer spricht: Monologe. Op der Lay, Esch-sur-Sûre 2007
 perfekt morden: Roman. Molden, Wien 2005
 Heimweg: Trilogien. Op der Lay, Esch-sur-Sûre 2000
 Manchmal spreche ich sie aus: Gedichte. Op der Lay, Esch-sur-Sûre 1999

External links 
 
 Homepage von Raoul Biltgen

1974 births
People from Esch-sur-Alzette
Living people
Luxembourgian male actors
Luxembourgian writers